I Ring Doorbells is a 1946 American comedy-drama film directed by Frank Strayer, which stars Anne Gwynne, Robert Shayne, and Roscoe Karns. The story was adapted by Dick Irving Hyland and Raymond L. Schrock from the book of the same name by Russell Birdwell, and Hyland wrote the screenplay. The picture was produced and distributed by Producers Releasing Corporation, which released it on February 25, 1946.

Cast list
 Anne Gwynne as Brooke Peters
 Robert Shayne as Dick Meadows
 Roscoe Karns as Stubby
 Pierre Watkin as G. B. Barton
 Harry Shannon as Shannon
 John Eldredge as Ransome
 Harry Tyler as Tippy Miller
 Doria Caron as Yvette
 Jan Wiley as Helen Carter
 Joel McGinnis as Clyde Barton
 Charles Wilson as The Inspector
 Hank Patterson as Bradley
 Eugene Stutenroth as O'Halloran
 Roy Darmour as Willie

References

External links
 
 
 

1946 comedy-drama films
1946 films
American comedy-drama films
American black-and-white films
Producers Releasing Corporation films
Films directed by Frank R. Strayer
1940s American films